David Picão (August 18, 1923 Ribeirão Preto - April 30, 2009 Sao Paulo) was the Brazilian bishop of the Roman Catholic Diocese of Santos from November 21, 1996 until his retirement on July 26, 2000.  The diocese is headquartered in Santos, São Paulo.  He was succeeded by the current bishop, Jacyr Francisco Braido.

David Picão died on April 30, 2009 in Sao Paulo at the age of 85.

References
Catholic Hierarchy: Bishop David Picão †
A Tribuna: Padres celebram missas no velório de Dom David (Portuguese)

1923 births
2009 deaths
People from Ribeirão Preto
20th-century Roman Catholic bishops in Brazil
Roman Catholic bishops of Santos
Roman Catholic bishops of São João da Boa Vista